Syncosmia is a genus of moths in the family Geometridae first described by Warren in 1897.

Species
Syncosmia craspedozona (Prout, 1958)
Syncosmia discisuffusa (Holloway, 1976)
Syncosmia dissographa (Prout, 1958)
Syncosmia eugerys (Prout, 1929)
Syncosmia eurymesa (Prout, 1926)
Syncosmia layanga (Holloway, 1976)
Syncosmia patinata Warren, 1897
Syncosmia seminotata (Warren, 1898)
Syncosmia trichophora (Hampson, 1895)
Syncosmia xanthocomes (Prout, 1926)

References

 (2010) "Further notes on Eupithecia (Lepidoptera: Geometridae) from Nepal and the Indian subcontinent". Transactions of the Lepidopterological Society of Japan. 61 (2): 137-172.

Eupitheciini